Mohammad Hasan Akhund (born  or ) is an Afghan mullah, politician and Taliban leader who is currently the acting prime minister of Afghanistan. 

Akhund is one of the founding members of the Taliban and has been a senior leading member of the movement. In the first Taliban government (1996–2001), he served as the deputy foreign minister.

Early life and education
Akhund is from southern Afghanistan. According to UN Security Council data, he was born in Pashmul, which at the time of his birth was in Panjwayi District, but is now in Zhari District, in Kandahar Province of the Kingdom of Afghanistan. The UN has two estimates for his year of birth, being approximately 1945–1950 and approximately 1955–1958.

He studied in various Islamic seminaries in Afghanistan. Unlike many Taliban leaders, Akhund did not participate in the Soviet–Afghan War.

Political career
Akhund is one of the oldest members of the Taliban, and was a close associate of Mohammed Omar, the first leader of the movement. During the Taliban rule (1996–2001), he served as the foreign minister of Afghanistan from 1998 to 27 October 1999, and was also the deputy prime minister during their rule. Like many other senior Taliban, he is subject to United Nations sanctions related to the sheltering of terrorist groups.

During the period of insurgency (2001–2021), Akhund was intermittently a member of the Quetta Shura. In 2013, he was the chief of the Taliban's commissions and the head of the recruitment commission.

Following the Taliban's return to power in 2021, Akhund was appointed interim Prime Minister. His appointment was seen as a compromise between the Taliban's moderate and hardline figures. He took office on 7 September 2021.

Additional information
Akhund is the author of several works on Islam. According to BBC News, he is more influential on the religious side of the Taliban, as opposed to the military side. A United States Institute for Peace analyst argued that he was more of a political person.

See also
 Mohammad Hasan Rahmani

Notes

References

|-

Afghan Muslims
Afghan Sunni Muslims
Prime Ministers of Afghanistan
Afghan Islamists
Taliban government ministers of Afghanistan
Pashtun people
People from Kandahar Province
Living people
Year of birth missing (living people)
20th-century births
Afghan writers
Muslim writers